Sahdev Singh Pundir is an Indian politician and member of the Bharatiya Janata Party. Pundir is a member of the Uttarakhand Legislative Assembly from the Sahaspur constituency in Dehradun district but the roads of the constituency especially of Gram Soda in Kanswali Kothri have been neglected for long time now. He holds a bachelor's degree in arts. Pundir has been vice-president of the BJP State Unit and is known to be a very amiable person.

References 
4-https://www.facebook.com/sudhowala

People from Dehradun district
Bharatiya Janata Party politicians from Uttarakhand
Uttarakhand MLAs 2022–2027
Living people
Uttarakhand MLAs 2017–2022
Year of birth missing (living people)